Petar Franjic (born 7 April 1992) is an Australian footballer who currently plays for Avondale FC in the National Premier Leagues Victoria.

Club career
Franjic joined the Melbourne Knights FC under 21 squad in 2009 after spending a number of years with the Victorian Institute of Sport. That year, he made his breakthrough into senior football, making six appearances for the first team in the Victorian Premier League in the first half of the season.

He was then picked up by A-League side Melbourne Victory FC, initially with the youth team. On 10 May 2010, he was signed to a two-year professional contract with Victory. On 9 January 2013, it was announced that Petar Franjic was released by mutual termination by Melbourne Victory to seek first team, playing opportunities. In his three seasons with the Victory, Franjic made 31 appearances in the league.

After short stints with Victorian sides Richmond SC and Hume City FC, in August 2014, Franjic moved to Uzbek League side Olmaliq. The Uzbeq adventure didn't last long for Franjic, who returned to Australia after making just three league appearances.

Upon his return to Australia, Franjic once more signed for Hume City FC.

Franjic signed for Avondale FC for the 2017 season.

Honours
With Australia:
 AFF U-16 Youth Championship: 2008

References

External links
 Melbourne Victory profile

1992 births
Living people
Australian soccer players
Melbourne Victory FC players
Hume City FC players
Avondale FC players
Australian people of Croatian descent
Victorian Institute of Sport alumni
A-League Men players
Association football midfielders
Association football defenders
Australian expatriate soccer players
Australian expatriate sportspeople in Uzbekistan
Expatriate footballers in Uzbekistan
FC AGMK players